"Bongo cha cha cha" is a song by French-Italian singer Caterina Valente. It was originally released in 1959 on a single. The song became a big national and international hit, being translated into several languages including Spanish, German, French and English.

In 1959, Valente signed a recording contract with Decca Records, thanks to the success achieved internationally and in particular in the United States, where her singles reached the top ten and her television appearances were warmly received by the public.

"Bongo cha cha cha" was written by Ernst Bader, Ralf Arnie, Werner Müller and Giuseppe Perotti under the pseudonym Pinchi, with conducting by Müller. The song is one of the first examples of Italian Cha cha cha, a Latin American dance of Cuban origins successfully imported also in Europe since the 1950s. The single was a great success and was included in the Miss Personality album, released in 1960. The single has been published in many countries including Germany, Yugoslavia, Australia, United States and Greece.

Uses in other media 
In 2013, the song was included on the soundtrack to the French film Elle s'en va (On My Way), directed by Emmanuelle Bercot, starring Catherine Deneuve.

In 2019, the song was included on the soundtrack to Spider-Man: Far from Home, directed by Jon Watts. The song went viral, gaining renewed popularity.

In 2021, the song went viral again via the social media platform TikTok, thanks to its use for a trend that has collected over 250 million views, started from Latin countries and South America, and later in Italy and Germany. In the wake of the revival, a house version remix was produced by the British house music group Goodboys, the song reached number 35 in the Italian charts. 

In 2022, the song was used in a Mecca Bingo advertisement.

Track listings 
7" single "Bongo cha cha cha" (Italy, 1959)
 A. "Bongo cha cha cha"
 (Ernst Bader, Ralf Arnie, Werner Müller and Giuseppe Perotti)
 B. "Guardando il cielo"
 (Ernst Bader, Ralf Arnie, Werner Müller and Giuseppe Perotti)
 Decca Records 45-C 16535

Digital single (2021)
 1. "Bongo cha cha cha - 2021 House Remix (2:23)
 2. "Bongo cha cha cha - 2021 House Remix - Extended Mix (4:00)
 3. "Bongo cha cha cha - 2021 House Remix - Instrumental (2:22)
Evergld/Odessa Mama Records

References 

1959 songs
1959 singles
Caterina Valente songs
Songs with lyrics by Ernst Bader